Volcán Ixtepeque is a stratovolcano in southern Guatemala. It consists of several rhyolitic lava domes and basaltic cinder cones. 
Its name is derived from the nahuatl word for obsidian. Ixtepeque was one of the most important obsidian sources in pre-Columbian Mesoamerica.

See also
 List of volcanoes in Guatemala

References 
 

Mountains of Guatemala
Volcano
Stratovolcanoes of Guatemala
Obsidian